Školska knjiga (lit. Schoolbook) is one of the largest publishing companies in Croatia. It was established in 1950. Until the mid-1990s it had a virtual monopoly on publishing schoolbooks, and this remains its core business.

References

External links
  

Publishing companies established in 1950
Publishing companies of Croatia
Educational book publishing companies
1950 establishments in Yugoslavia
1950 establishments in Croatia
Companies based in Zagreb